Seongbuk District (Seongbuk-gu) is one of the 25 gu which make up the city of Seoul, South Korea. It is located in the mid-north part of the city. The current Mayor is Kim Young-bae (김영배), who has been mayor since July 1, 2010. Seongbuk-gu was established under Presidential Decree No. 159 on August 13, 1949 (including some areas of Dongdaemun-gu and some areas of Sungin-myeon, Goyang-gun), and was promoted to a autonomous district by implementing a Gu-level local government on May 1, 1988.

In this district, more than 1,500 public officials are making every effort to realize a "closer neighborhood, happier neighborhood" in which the civic future value of balance, coexistence, and abundance is contained in the city.

Administrative divisions

Seongbuk District consists of 20 administrative dongs (haengjeong-dong, 행정동) and 39 legal dongs (beopjeong-dong, 법정동).

Anam-dong (안암동 安岩洞)
Bomun-dong (보문동 普門洞)
Donam-dong (돈암동 敦岩洞) 1∼2
Dongseon-dong (동선동 東仙洞) 1∼2
Dongsomun-dong (동소문동 東小門洞)
Gireum-dong (길음동 吉音洞) 1∼3
Jangwi-dong (장위동 長位洞) 1∼3
Jeongneung-dong (정릉동 貞陵洞) 1∼4
Jongam-dong (종암동 鍾岩洞) 1∼2
Samseon-dong (삼선동 三仙洞) 1∼2
Sangwolgok-dong (상월곡동 上月谷洞)
Seokgwan-dong (석관동 石串洞) 1∼2
Seongbuk-dong (성북동 城北洞) 1∼2
Wolgok-dong (월곡동 月谷洞) 1∼4동
Hawolgok-dong (하월곡동 下月谷洞), beopjeong-dong administered by the haengjeong-dong offices of Wolgok 1 ~2 dong

Attractions
 Korea Furniture Museum

Transportation

Railroad
Seoul Metro
Seoul Subway Line 4
(Gangbuk-gu) ← Gireum—Sungshin's Women's University—Hansung University → (Jongno-gu)
Seoul Metropolitan Rapid Transit Corporation
Seoul Subway Line 6
(Jongno-gu) ← Bomun—Anam—Korea University—Wolgok—Sangwolgok—Dolgoji → (Nowon-gu) 
Ui LRT

Sister cities
 Shunyi, China

Notable people from Seongbuk District
 Um Ki-joon (Hangul: 엄기준), South Korean actor
 Bumkey (Real Name: Kwon Ki-bum, Hangul: 권기범), South Korean R&B singer-songwriter (born in Seongbuk District)
 Wendy (Real Name: Shon Seung-wan or Son Seung-wan, Hangul: 손승완), singer, dancer, model, MC and K-pop idol, member of K-pop girlgroup Red Velvet (born in Seongbuk District)
 Lee Jin-hyuk, singer, rapper and actor, member of Up10tion (born in Seongbuk District)
 Yoon Suk-yeol, 13th President of South Korea (born in Seongbuk District)
 Hwang Yun-seong, singer, dancer, idol and member of Drippin (born in Seongbuk District)
 Sim Jae-Yun (Aka. Jake Sim), singer, rapper, dancer, songwriter, a member of ENHYPEN (born in Seongbuk District)

References

External links

Official website

 
Districts of Seoul